The Polish Merchant Navy (PMH) was created in the interwar period when the Second Polish Republic regained independence.

During World War II, many ships of the Polish Navy joined the Allied merchant navy and its convoys, as part of the Polish contribution to World War II.

After the war, the Polish Merchant Navy was controlled by the People's Republic of Poland and after 1989, by modern Poland.

Numbers
Total: 57 ships (1,000 GT or over) totaling 1,120,165 GT/

Ships by type:
bulk 50, cargo 2, chemical tanker 2, roll-on/roll-off 1, short-sea passenger 2 
(1999 est.)

Major companies
Major Polish shipping companies include:
Polska Żegluga Morska (Polish Steamship Company, POLSTEAM)
Polskie Linie Oceaniczne (Polish Ocean Lines, POL)

See also

Polish Navy

References

Merchant navies by country
Water transport in Poland